Vittoria Mongardi (26 February 1926 – 26 November 1975) was an Italian singer and actress, mainly successful between the second half of the 1940s and the 1950s.

Life and career 
Born in Bologna, after starting out as a model and appearing in minor roles in a few films, Mongardi made her debut as a singer performing for a group of American soldiers in a military officers' club in Trieste with the orchestra led by Guido Cergoli.

In the 1950s Mongardi became the vocalist in the Armando Fragna orchestra and was one of the main protagonists of the fourth edition of the Sanremo Music Festival, performing four songs, notably the successful "Aveva un bavero" she performed together with Duo Fasano. In 1961 she married a journalist and in the following years she gradually slowed her activities, until her death from an incurable disease in 1975.

References

External links 

1926 births
1975 deaths
Musicians from Bologna
Italian pop singers
Italian women singers
Italian film actresses